Pucacocha (Quechua puka red, qucha lake, "red lake") is a mountain at a little lake of that name in the Cordillera Negra in the Andes of Peru, about  high. It is situated in the Ancash Region, Yungay Province, on the border of the districts of Cascapara and Quillo. Pucacocha lies between the Sechin River in the north and the Putaqa River in the south.

References

External links 

Mountains of Peru
Mountains of Ancash Region
Lakes of Peru
Lakes of Ancash Region